Sandgerðisbót or Bótin  is a small wharfside area in Akureyri, Iceland. There is a small craft marina and some residences.

Houses
Byrgi (built in 1898)
Eyri (next to small craft marina)
Ós (former school)
Sæból (demolished, stood near Byrgi)

Glerárholt
Sæborg 
Holt

North Iceland